Lisa Lyttelton, Dowager Viscountess Cobham (born 30 December 1958 as Lisa Clayton) is the first British woman to sail single-handed and non-stop around the world.  She was educated in Birmingham at the Church of England School for Girls, Edgbaston, and the University of Birmingham.

On 17 September 1994 Clayton set out to attempt two world records, namely "Fastest Sail Around the World by a Woman, Single-Handed Without Assistance" and "First British Woman to Sail Single-Handed and Non-Stop Around the World." She returned on 29 June 1995, after 285 days at sea.

On her thirty-eight foot yacht, called Spirit of Birmingham, Clayton survived the  journey despite capsizing twice. Her vessel was named after her home city and the university which contributed over £40,000 and expertise to make it possible for Clayton to realise her dream. On 1 October 1996, Clayton was recognised as an Honorary Freeman of the City of Birmingham.

On 1 August 1997 she married the 11th Viscount Cobham, owner of Hagley Hall in Worcestershire. He died in 2006.

References

1950s births
Living people
Alumni of the University of Birmingham
British sailors
Single-handed circumnavigating sailors
Cobham
Female explorers
British explorers